Yücel Çolak (born 13 November 1968 in Samsun) is a Turkish football manager, and a retired footballer who played as a forward in the Turkish Süper Lig, as well as the lower divisions of Turkey.

Professional career
A journeyman striker, Yücel began his career in his hometown of Samsun representing Samsunspor. He very briefly transferred to Galatasaray  and made one appearance for them at the TSYD Cup on 12 August 1990. Prolific in the lower divisions, Yücel was top scorer with Mersin İdmanyurdu in the 1991–1992 season of the TFF Second League.

Personal life
Yücel  is the brother of the footballer Tanju Çolak.

References

External links
 at TFF.org
 Managing Profile at TFF.org
 
 Mackolik ManagementProfile

1968 births
Living people
People from Samsun
Turkish footballers
Turkey youth international footballers
Turkish football managers
Samsunspor footballers
Sakaryaspor footballers
Galatasaray S.K. footballers
Mersin İdman Yurdu footballers
Sarıyer S.K. footballers
Kartalspor footballers
Turanspor footballers
Göztepe S.K. footballers
İzmirspor footballers
Siirtspor footballers
Süper Lig players
TFF First League players
TFF Second League players
Association football forwards